is a Japanese manga series about recreational fishing by Yasuyuki Kosaka. It has been serialized in Akita Shoten's seinen manga magazine Young Champion Retsu since February 2017 and collected in nine tankōbon volumes as of June 2022. An anime television series adaptation by Doga Kobo aired from April 7 to September 22, 2020.

Characters
 

Hina is the main protagonist who moves with her family from Tokyo back to her home town of Ashikita, Kumamoto, Kyushu. She ends up joining the Breakwater Club at her new school.
 

Hina's childhood friend, whom Hina had nearly forgotten, she is a first-year like Hina and also a new member of the Breakwater Club. She is passionate about fishing, and has been fishing since elementary school.

An older girl who convinces Hina to join the Breakwater Club at their school, of which she is the president. She is a third-year. 

A second-year in the Breakwater Club, she is quite knowledgeable and reliable. She is a tall girl who wears glasses and always fishes with a lifejacket.

The school nurse and the faculty adviser of the Breakwater Club.
Hina's Father

He was a member of the club when he went to school. Hina's grandfather left behind an assortment of fishing gear.
Takohigeya Manager

He runs the local fishing supplies store whose mascot is a small red octopus.

Media

Manga
The manga is written and illustrated by Yasuyuki Kosaka, and began serialization in Akita Shoten's Young Champion Retsu magazine in February 2017. It has been published as nine tankōbon volumes by June 20, 2022 In July 2020, it was announced that the manga would go on hiatus due to heavy flooding in Kosaka's home of Kyushu; the series resumed serialization shortly afterward. In November 2020, it was announced it will go on a hiatus again at a later date. Publication resumed in April 2021.

Anime
The 12-episode anime television series adaptation was announced in the fifth issue of Young Champion Retsu magazine on April 16, 2019. The series is animated by Doga Kobo and directed by Takaharu Okuma, with Fumihiko Shimo handling series composition, Katsuhiro Kumagai designing the characters, and Miki Sakurai composing the music. It aired from April 7 to September 22, 2020. The opening theme "SEA HORIZON" and end credits song "Tsuri no Sekai e" were both performed by the main cast. On April 15, 2020, it was announced that episode 4 and onward were delayed until further notice due to the effects of the COVID-19 pandemic. On June 1, 2020, it was announced that the anime series would resume on July 7, 2020 from the first episode, with the fourth episode airing on July 28, 2020.

Drama
A live-action television series was announced on January 17, 2023. It will premiere in Q3 2023.

Reception
Anime News Network had four editors review the first episode of the anime: Nick Creamer felt the premiere suffered from "structural, narrative, and aesthetic issues" that prevent it from capturing the same rural Japan aura as Laid-Back Camp and displayed "tonal incongruity" with its subject matter and the Breakwater Club's hostile treatment towards Hina; Rebecca Silverman was also critical of the fishing club's cruel tactics on Hina but was commendable for their faithful portrayal of "the attitude of small coastal towns" and their various activities, concluding that fans of "slow-paced fishing stories" will enjoy it but may not attract others beyond its targeted genre audience; Theron Martin wrote that: "[T]echnical merits here are decent but nothing exceptional, so the question here is going to be whether the "cute girls" appeal can draw in those not interested in the hobby. In that regard, I put it on about the same level as Tamayomi: might be watchable, but being at least receptive to the hobby in question will matter." The fourth reviewer, James Beckett, praised its "cozy slice-of-life charm" for carrying a "soft and inviting" art direction and a likable cast that will bring Hina out of her ichthyophobia as the story progresses. Beckett added that he won't watch any further, but concluded that: "It will, however, provide much edutainment for folks who either have fond fishing memories of their own, and also for anyone who is interested in learning more about the craft with the help of a bunch of nice anime girls."

References

External links
  
  
 
 Diary of Our Days at the Breakwater Produces Fishing Etiquette Pamphlet with Japanese Government-Crunchyroll News

Akita Shoten manga
Anime postponed due to the COVID-19 pandemic
Anime productions suspended due to the COVID-19 pandemic
Anime series based on manga
Doga Kobo
Fishing in anime and manga
Funimation
Muse Communication
Seinen manga